Fact constellation is a measure of online analytical processing, which is a collection of multiple fact tables sharing dimension tables, viewed as a collection of stars. It can be seen as an extension of the star schema.
  
A fact constellation schema has multiple fact tables. It is also known as galaxy schema. It is widely used schema and more complex than star schema and snowflake schema. It is possible to create fact constellation schema by splitting original star schema into more star schema. It has many fact tables and some common dimension table.

See also
 Online analytical processing
 Star schema
 Snowflake schema

References

Online analytical processing